Luchteren is a village in East Flanders, Belgium, within the municipality of Ghent.

Luchteren is the most rural parish of Drongen district, located on the main N461 road.

Most shops and other important features are located in the main streets Beekstraat, Antoon Catriestraat, Boskeetstraat and Gavergrachtstraat, the last one holding the small parish church, the only school and the only bar of the village. Halewijn is a distinct neighbourhood within Luchteren.

Luchteren borders the Drongen parishes of Baarle (south) and Central Drongen (east), the Ghent submunicipality of Mariakerke (northeast), the Nevele submunicipality of Merendree, and Vinderhoute, Lovendegem's only submunicipality.

Geography of Ghent
Populated places in East Flanders